Toni Ivanov (Bulgarian: Тони Иванов; born 21 March 1999) is a Bulgarian professional footballer who plays as a midfielder for Bulgarian Second League club Yantra Gabrovo.

Career

Slavia Sofia
Ivanov moved to Slavia Sofia on 8 January 2018 coming from Ludogorets Razgrad Academy. He made his professional debut for the team on 18 February 2018 in the first league match for the year, against his youth club Ludogorets Razgrad. On 29 April 2018, he scored his first goal in a league match against Pirin Blagoevgrad.

Career statistics

Club

Honours
Slavia Sofia
 Bulgarian Cup (1): 2017–18

References

External links
 

1999 births
Living people
Bulgarian footballers
Bulgaria youth international footballers
PFC Ludogorets Razgrad II players
PFC Slavia Sofia players
FC Lokomotiv Gorna Oryahovitsa players
FC CSKA 1948 Sofia players
SFC Etar Veliko Tarnovo players
FC Yantra Gabrovo players
Association football midfielders
People from Gabrovo